Live at Hammersmith is a live album by American heavy metal band Twisted Sister, released on October 3, 1994. It was recorded on June 15, 1984 at the Hammersmith Odeon in London, England.

Track listing
All songs written by Dee Snider except where noted.
CD 1
 "What You Don't Know (Sure Can Hurt You)" – 4:43
 "The Kids Are Back" – 2:49
 "Stay Hungry" – 5:09
 "Destroyer" – 4:10
 "We're Not Gonna Take It" – 3:17
 "You Can't Stop Rock 'n' Roll" – 7:23
 "Like a Knife in the Back" – 2:47
 "Shoot 'em Down" – 3:19
 "Under the Blade" – 4:35

CD 2
 "Burn in Hell" – 5:49
 "I Am (I'm Me)" – 5:25
 "I Wanna Rock" – 13:05
 "S.M.F." – 7:27
 "We're Gonna Make It" 4:20
 "Jailhouse Rock" (Jerry Leiber, Mike Stoller) (live at Detroit, Port Chester, New York, 1979) – 3:17
 "Train Kept a-Rollin'" (Tiny Bradshaw) (live at Detroit, Port Chester, New York, 1979) – 10:06

Credits

Twisted Sister
Dee Snider – lead vocals
Eddie "Fingers" Ojeda – lead & rhythm guitars
Jay Jay French – rhythm & lead guitars, backing vocals, executive producer
Mark "The Animal" Mendoza – bass, backing vocals, producer, mixing
A. J. Pero – drums, percussion
Tony Petri – drums on "Jailhouse Rock" and "Train Kept a Rollin'"

Production
Charlie Barreca – live sound mixing
Denny McNerney – engineer, mixing

References

Twisted Sister albums
1994 live albums
Albums recorded at the Hammersmith Apollo
Music for Nations live albums
CMC International live albums
SPV/Steamhammer live albums